Adventure in Time is a text adventure for the Apple II published in 1981 by Phoenix Software. An Atari 8-bit family version was released in 1983.

By means of text descriptions and two word text commands, the player travels through four locations in time, attempting to find and kill Nostradamus before he assembles a world destroying weapon.

Development
Adventure in Time was the first game released by Illinois software company Phoenix Software, after developer Ron Unrath contacted programmer Paul Berker about writing an adventure game for the Apple II in 1980.

Reception
Rudy Kraft reviewed Adventure in Time in The Space Gamer No. 49. Kraft commented that "Although the game does provide a little fun, there are many better games on the market. Your money would be better spent on one of them." Mike Flyn of Hardcore Computing commented that while it was relatively easy, "I also found it to be rather entertaining, and on that note I do recommend it." In The Book of Adventure Games, Kim Schuette commented that "The crisp, quick response, tongue-in-cheek style, and save option further add to the game's appeal."

References

External links
 
 
 Softalk review
Review in The Book Of Apple Computer Software 1982

1980s interactive fiction
1981 video games
Apple II games
Atari 8-bit family games
Dinosaurs in video games
Video games about time travel
Video games developed in the United States